Lieutenant General Azhar Abbas  is a retired three-star ranking general in the Pakistani Army, who served as the 35th  Chief of General Staff (CGS) of the Pakistan Army. He was appointed to the position on 8 September 2021, was replaced by Lieutenant-General Muhammad Saeed.

Chief of General Staff is responsible for operational and intelligence matters at the General Headquarters in Rawalpindi. Abbas was commissioned in the 41st Battalion of Baloch Regiment. Previously, he served as Commandant School of Infantry and Tactics in Quetta, headed a division in Murree, worked as a Brigadier in the Operations Directorate, and was also a Private Secretary to the former Chief of Army Staff, General Raheel Sharif.

Awards & Decorations

Foreign decorations

Dates of Rank

References

Living people
Pakistani generals
Year of birth missing (living people)